Climax! (later known as Climax Mystery Theater) is an American television anthology series that aired on CBS from 1954 to 1958. The series was hosted by William Lundigan and later co-hosted by Mary Costa. It was one of the few CBS programs of that era to be broadcast in color, using the massive TK-40A color cameras pioneered and manufactured by RCA, and used primarily by CBS' arch-rival network, NBC (the broadcasting division of RCA). Many of the episodes were performed and broadcast live, but, although the series was transmitted in color, only black-and-white kinescope copies of some episodes survive to the present day. The series finished at #22 in the Nielsen ratings for the 1955-1956 season and #26 for 1956-1957.

Notable episodes
In 1954, the Climax! episode "Casino Royale" featured  secret agent James Bond in a television adaptation of Ian Fleming's novel Casino Royale. It starred Barry Nelson as American secret agent "Jimmy Bond" and Peter Lorre as the villain Le Chiffre. This was the first screen adaptation of a James Bond novel, made before Eon Productions acquired the Bond film rights. Eon would later obtain the rights to Casino Royale in the late 1990s. This adaptation is available on DVD as a bonus feature on the MGM DVD release of the 1967 film adaptation of the novel.

The Lou Gehrig Story was released on a DVD named Legends of Baseball, America's Pastime by PC Treasures, LLC. The disc also features The Jackie Robinson Story.

The only other episode of Climax! available on DVD is Gore Vidal's adaptation of Robert Louis Stevenson's The Strange Case of Dr. Jekyll and Mr. Hyde, retitled on Climax! as "Dr. Jekyll & Mr. Hyde".  It stars Michael Rennie, Sir Cedric Hardwicke, and Lowell Gilmore; it is available in the DVD box set "Classic Sci-Fi TV - 150 Episodes" from Mill Creek Entertainment.

In an earlier episode of Climax!, an adaptation of Raymond Chandler's The Long Goodbye, actor Tristram Coffin, playing a dead body, arose in shot and walked off stage. The event was widely covered in the media of the day, later becoming an urban legend that was attributed to Peter Lorre and the previously mentioned adaptation of Casino Royale.

In addition, a small number of select episodes from the series can be found on YouTube.

Episodes

Season 1: 1954–55

Season 2: 1955–56

Season 3: 1956–57

Season 4: 1957–58

Guest stars
(in alphabetical order)

Julie Adams
Anna Maria Alberghetti
Eddie Albert
Don Ameche
Edward Arnold
Mary Astor
Anne Bancroft
Ethel Barrymore
Ralph Bellamy
Joan Bennett
Jack Benny
Ward Bond
Richard Boone
Lloyd Bridges
Terry Burnham
Raymond Burr
Rory Calhoun
Art Carney
John Carradine
Jack Carson
John Cassavetes
Lon Chaney Jr
Linda Christian
Steve Cochran
Claudette Colbert
Wendell Corey
Hume Cronyn
Mary Costa
Linda Darnell
Jane Darwell
Laraine Day
Brandon deWilde
Paul Douglas
Tom Drake
Joanne Dru
James Dunn
Geraldine Fitzgerald
Nina Foch
John Forsythe
Anne Francis
Betty Furness
Eva Gabor
Zsa Zsa Gabor
Farley Granger
Bonita Granville
Coleen Gray
Peter Graves
Jean Hagen
Sir Cedric Hardwicke
Charlton Heston
Paul Henreid
Celeste Holm
Jeffrey Hunter
Kim Hunter
Tab Hunter
Ruth Hussey
Vivi Janiss
Louis Jourdan
Katy Jurado
Boris Karloff
Phyllis Kirk
Jack Klugman
Angela Lansbury
Peter Lawford
Cloris Leachman
June Lockhart
Marjorie Lord
Peter Lorre
Barton MacLane
Walter Matthau
Raymond Massey
Lee Marvin
Mercedes McCambridge
Dorothy McGuire
Steve McQueen
Patricia Medina
Vera Miles
Sal Mineo
Thomas Mitchell
Robert Mitchum
Elizabeth Montgomery
Agnes Moorehead
Rita Moreno
Barry Nelson
Edmond O'Brien
Margaret O'Brien
Pat O'Brien
Dennis O'Keefe
Susan Oliver
Maureen O'Sullivan
Dick Powell
Robert Preston
Vincent Price
Dale Robertson
Edward G. Robinson
Cesar Romero
Ann Rutherford
Sylvia Sidney
William Shatner
Red Skelton
Dean Stockwell
Elaine Stritch
Yma Sumac
Joan Tetzel
Franchot Tone
Claire Trevor
Lana Turner
Eli Wallach
Ethel Waters
John Wayne
James Whitmore
Shelley Winters
Joanne Woodward
Teresa Wright

References

External links
 
 Climax! at CVTA with episode list
 

1954 American television series debuts
1958 American television series endings
1950s American anthology television series
CBS original programming
English-language television shows
Casino Royale (novel)